Rick Venturi (born February 23, 1946) is a former American football player, coach and current broadcaster.  He served as the head coach at Northwestern University and as longtime National Football League (NFL) assistant coach known for his defense.   As the head coach at Northwestern from 1978 to 1980, Venturi compiled a record of 1-31-1.  During his tenure as coach of the Northwestern Wildcats' NCAA Division I began a record 34-game losing streak.  

After leaving Northwestern, Venturi spent 12 years as an assistant with the Baltimore/Indianapolis Colts, eventually rising to defensive coordinator. He also served as defensive coordinator of the Cleveland Browns, New Orleans Saints, and St. Louis Rams.  

Venturi also served as interim head coach of the Colts in 1991 and the Saints in 1996. His career record stands at 2–17. He now serves as the analyst on the Colts Radio Network. 

Venturi played quarterback at Rockford Auburn High School in Illinois as a sophomore and junior, and then at Pekin High School for his senior year before enrolling at Northwestern. While at Northwestern he joined the Delta Upsilon fraternity.  His father, Joe Venturi, was a member of the Illinois High School Football Coaches Hall of Fame. Joe coached at Pekin High School in Illinois. His brother, John is also a member of the Illinois High School Football Coaches Hall of Fame. John coached at Washington High School where he won the 1985 Class 4A State Championship. John's 1983 Washington team was the 4A Runner-Up.

Head coaching record

College

NFL

* Interim head coach.

References

1946 births
Living people
American football quarterbacks
Illinois Fighting Illini football coaches
Indianapolis Colts coaches
Indianapolis Colts head coaches
Cleveland Browns coaches
Hamilton Tiger-Cats coaches
National Football League defensive coordinators
New Orleans Saints coaches
New Orleans Saints head coaches
Northwestern Wildcats football coaches
Northwestern Wildcats football players
Purdue Boilermakers football coaches
St. Louis Rams coaches